The Fund for Armenian Relief (FAR) is a US humanitarian organization. It provides short-term emergency relief and long-term programs focusing on child protection, economic development, education, health care, and social services.

FAR was founded in response to the 1988 Armenian earthquake by Dr. Edgar Housepian, Archbishop Torkom Manoogian, and Kevork Hovnanian. Headquartered in New York City, it also has offices in Armenia and in the  Nagorno-Karabakh Republic . It has more than 180 employees. Its diverse programs include a Homeless Children's Center, an Information Technology Center, educational scholarship programs, a Medical Education Program, soup kitchens, and senior centers.

References

International development agencies
Armenia–United States relations
1988 establishments in the United States
Organizations established in 1988
Soviet Union–United States relations